Mateus da Silva Santos Borelli (born October 19, 1993), known as Mateus Borelli, is a Brazilian footballer who plays for Almirante Barroso as midfielder.

Career statistics

References

External links

1993 births
Living people
Brazilian footballers
Association football midfielders
Campeonato Brasileiro Série B players
Guaratinguetá Futebol players
Rio Branco Esporte Clube players